Gustaf Adolfs torg ("Gustaf Adolf's square") is a town square located in central Gothenburg, Sweden. It was named Stortorget (the Big Square) until 1854 when a statue of the founding father of Gothenburg, king Gustavus Adolphus of Sweden was raised. Surrounding the square are the city hall, including the law court extension (by Gunnar Asplund), the bourse, and the main harbour canal of Gothenburg.

Squares in Gothenburg
Cultural depictions of Gustavus Adolphus of Sweden
Statues of monarchs
Statues of military officers